Dario Zahora (born 21 March 1982 in Vukovar) is a Croatian football striker, who is currently a free agent. Zahora started his career from Croatian team Dinamo Zagreb. From there he was loaned out to Croatia Sesvete, Koper, Slaven Belupo, Domžale and Interblock. He continued his career to Rosenborg before joining Bnei Sakhnin. After Israel he had short spells with Lokomotiva, Lokomotiv Plovdiv and Osijek before moving to Greece for Ergotelis and Iraklis.

Zahora has made several appearances for the Croatian U21 team, also playing for other junior teams from his home country.

Club career
Zahora started his career with Dinamo Zagreb with which he scored 39 goals from 2001 to 2005. He made his professional debut with Croatia Sesvete in Druga HNL, the second tier of Croatia, scoring 15 goals in 24 appearances. After playing for Dinamo Zagreb for four seasons he was loaned out to Slovenian PrvaLiga outfit Koper where he appeared on 18 occasions scoring a total of 9 goals. In the next season he was loaned to Slaven Belupo making 3 goals out of 10 matches. In the 2007–08 season he played for NK Domžale in Slovenia, on loan, where he won the championship and was the league's top goalscorer with 22 goals in 34 matches.

On 31 August 2012 he signed for Greek Football League club Ergotelis. He scored 8 goals for Ergotelis in 32 matches. On 4 July 2013 he signed for Iraklis in the Greek Football League. He scored on his debut for his new club in an away 3–2 loss against Kavala.

Honours

Club
Rosenborg BK
Norwegian Premier League Championship: 2009

NK Dinamo Zagreb
 Croatian Championship 2002/2003, 2005/2006
 Croatian Cup 2000/2001, 2001/2002, 2003/2004
 Croatian Supercup 2002, 2003

NK Slaven Belupo
 Croatian Cup 2006/2007 Final

NK Domzale
 Slovenian Championship 2007/2008
 Slovenian Supercup 2007

NK Interblock
 Slovenian Supercup 2008

References

External links

Player profile - Rosenborg BK (unofficial)
Player profile - PrvaLiga

1982 births
Living people
Sportspeople from Vukovar
Association football forwards
Croatian footballers
Croatia under-21 international footballers
Croatia youth international footballers
GNK Dinamo Zagreb players
NK Croatia Sesvete players
FC Koper players
NK Slaven Belupo players
NK Domžale players
NK IB 1975 Ljubljana players
Rosenborg BK players
Bnei Sakhnin F.C. players
NK Lokomotiva Zagreb players
PFC Lokomotiv Plovdiv players
NK Osijek players
Ergotelis F.C. players
Iraklis Thessaloniki F.C. players
Croatian Football League players
Slovenian PrvaLiga players
Eliteserien players
Israeli Premier League players
First Professional Football League (Bulgaria) players
Football League (Greece) players
Croatian expatriate footballers
Expatriate footballers in Slovenia
Croatian expatriate sportspeople in Slovenia
Expatriate footballers in Norway
Croatian expatriate sportspeople in Norway
Expatriate footballers in Israel
Croatian expatriate sportspeople in Israel
Expatriate footballers in Bulgaria
Croatian expatriate sportspeople in Bulgaria
Expatriate footballers in Greece
Croatian expatriate sportspeople in Greece